Ulomyia fuliginosa is a species of fly in the family Psychodidae. It is found in the Palearctic.

References

Psychodidae
Insects described in 1818